Ettore Piergiovanni was an Italian film actor active during the silent era. He also directed three films during the early 1920s.

Selected filmography
 Hedda Gabler (1920)
 The Youth of the Devil (1921)

References

Bibliography
 Goble, Alan. The Complete Index to Literary Sources in Film. Walter de Gruyter, 1999.

External links

Year of birth unknown
Year of death unknown
Italian film directors
Italian male film actors
Italian male silent film actors
20th-century Italian male actors